Ko Chang, Chiang Rai is a village and tambon (sub-district) of Mae Sai District, in Chiang Rai Province, Thailand. In 2005, it had a population of 9,964 people. The tambon contains 13 villages.

References

Tambon of Chiang Rai province
Populated places in Chiang Rai province